Everard Digby (1440 – died 1509) was an English politician.

The son of Everard de Digby (d. 1461), he was a Member (MP) of the Parliament of England for Rutland in 1478 and 1491–92, and probably also 1484.

His son, Everard Digby (died 1540), was also MP for Rutland.

References

1440 births
1509 deaths
English MPs 1478
English MPs 1491